A tandoor ( or ) is a large urn-shaped oven, usually made of clay, originating from the Indian Subcontinent. Since antiquity, tandoors have been used to bake unleavened flatbreads, such as  roti and naan, as well as to roast meat. The tandoor is predominantly used in Western Asian, Central Asian, South Asian, and Horn of African cuisines.

The roots of the tandoor can be traced back over 5000 years to the ancient Indus Valley Civilization, one of the oldest known civilizations. The standard heating element of a tandoor is an internal charcoal or wood fire, which cooks food with direct heat and smoke. Tandoors can be fully above ground, or partially buried below ground, often reaching over a meter in height/depth. Temperatures in a tandoor can reach , and they are routinely kept lit for extended periods. Therefore, traditional tandoors are usually found in restaurant kitchens. Modern tandoors are often made of metal. Variations, such as tandoors with gas or electric heating elements, are more common for at-home use.

Etymology

The English word comes from Urdu tandūr, which came from Persian tanūr (Also appears in Arabic as tannūr ) and ultimately came from the Akkadian word tinūru (𒋾𒂟), which consists of the parts tin "mud" and nuro/nura "fire" and is mentioned as early as in the Akkadian Epic of Gilgamesh, c.f. or Avestan tanûra and Middle Persian tanûr. In Sanskrit, the tandoor was referred to as kandu.

Words related and similar to tandoor are used in various languages, for example the Dari Persian words tandūr and tanūr, Arabic tannūr (تنّور), Armenian t’onir (Թոնիր), Assyrian tanūra (ܬܢܘܪܐ), Azerbaijani təndir, Georgian tone (თონე), Hebrew tanúr (תנור), Kyrgyz tandyr (тандыр), Kazakh tandyr (тандыр), Kurdish tenûr, Tat tənur, Tajik tanur (танур), Turkish tandır, Turkmen tamdyr, Uzbek tandir, Luganda ttanuulu, and Somali tinaar.

Operation 

The first time a tandoor is used, the temperature must be gradually increased to condition the oven's interior. This step is crucial in ensuring the longevity of the tandoor. Conditioning can be done by starting a very small fire and slowly adding fuel to increase the amount of heat inside the tandoor gradually.
Hairline cracks might form during conditioning; this is normal and will not interfere with the performance of the tandoor oven. When the oven cools off, the hairline cracks will barely be noticeable. They are essential in allowing the clay body of the tandoor to breathe (thermal expansion and contraction).
The slower the temperature inside the tandoor increases during its first use, the fewer hairline cracks will develop.

Types

Arab world: tannour / tannur

Persianate world and Southern Asia

Afghan tandoor
The Afghan tandoor sits above the ground and is made of bricks.

Punjabi tandoor

Tandoor cooking is a traditional aspect of Punjabi cuisine in undivided Punjab.

In India and Pakistan, tandoori cooking was traditionally associated with the Punjab, as Punjabis embraced the tandoor on a regional level, and became popular in the mainstream after the 1947 partition when Punjabi Sikhs and Hindus resettled in places such as Delhi. In rural Punjab, it was common to have communal tandoors.
Some villages still have a communal tandoor, a common sight before 1947.

Armenian tonir
In ancient times, the tonir was worshiped by the Armenians as a symbol of the sun in the ground. Armenians made tonirs resembling the setting sun "going into the ground" (the Sun being the main deity). The underground tonir, made of clay, is one of the first tools in Armenian cuisine as an oven and thermal treatment tool. Armenians are said to have originated underground tonirs.

Azerbaijani tandir

In ancient times, people used it to cook bread and various dishes.

Tandir bread (təndir çörəyi, tandoori bread) is a widespread bread type in Azerbaijan. Tandir bread is baked from the heat of the tandir's walls, which ensures very fast baking.

One of the world's biggest tandoors was built in Azerbaijan's southern city of Astara in 2015. The tandoor consists of 3 parts.

Turkmen tamdyr

Baking, a traditional, white bread called  in Turkmen, is an ancient and honored culinary ritual in Turkmenistan.

Most Turkmen families living in the rural area have tamdyrs in their households. Occasionally, housewives get together and bake  for several families. Turkmens bake not only bread in the tamdyr but also several dishes, the most famous of which is somsa (an independent dish, similar to a pie, of any shape with a filling, usually beef).
Various spices can be added to the Turkmen bread: cumin, cinnamon, olives, mustard, sunflower seeds and other flavoring ingredients. To prepare tamdyr for baking; first, fire is made directly inside the tamdyr, usually using dried cotton stalks. The bread-maker then watches the color of the tamdyr's inner walls. When they turn white, the ashes are shoveled into the center of the tamdyr, and the lower ash-pit is closed.

The bread must be thrown into the oven carefully but deftly so that it does not lose shape and neatly sticks to the wall.

Dishes 

A tandoor may be used to bake many different types of flatbread. Some of the most common are tandoori roti, tandoori naan, tandoori laccha paratha, missi roti, laffa, and tandoori kulcha.

Peshawari Khar is roasted cashews and cottage cheese paste marinated in spiced thick cream grilled in a tandoor.

Balochs and aloos are potatoes stuffed with cottage cheese, vegetables, and cashew nuts, roasted in a tandoor.

Tandoori chicken is a roasted chicken delicacy that originated in Punjab region of South Asia. The chicken is marinated in yogurt seasoned with garam masala, garlic, ginger, cumin, cayenne pepper, and other spices depending on the recipe. In hot versions of the dish, cayenne, red chili powder, or other spices give the typical red color; in milder versions, food coloring is used. Turmeric produces a yellow-orange color. It is traditionally cooked at high temperatures in a tandoor but can also be prepared on a traditional grill.

Chicken tikka is a dish from Mughlai cuisine that originated in Punjab region. It is made by grilling small pieces of boneless chicken which have been marinated in spices and yogurt. It is traditionally cooked on skewers in a tandoor and is usually boneless. It is normally served and eaten with a green coriander chutney or used in preparing the curry chicken tikka masala.

Tangdi kabab, a popular snack in cuisine from the Indian subcontinent, is made by marinating chicken drumsticks and placing them in a tandoor. Various freshly ground spices are added to the yogurt to form a marinade for the chicken. Traditionally, the marinaded chicken is given 12 hours at the least. When prepared, the drumsticks are usually garnished with mint leaves and served with laccha (finely sliced half moons, with a squeeze of lemon and a pinch of salt) onions.

Samosa is a stuffed snack consisting of a fried or baked triangular, semilunar, or tetrahedral pastry shell with a savory filling, which may include spiced potatoes, onions, peas, coriander, and lentils, or ground lamb or chicken. The size and shape of a samosa and the consistency of the pastry used can vary considerably. In some regions of Central Asia (i.e., Kazakhstan, Kyrgyzstan, Tajikistan, Turkmenistan and Uzbekistan), samosas are typically baked in a tandoor, while they are usually fried elsewhere.

See also

References

Bibliography

 Curry Club Tandoori and Tikka Dishes, Piatkus, London —  (1993)
 Curry Club 100 Favourite Tandoori Recipes, Piatkus, London —   &  (1995)
 India: Food & Cooking, New Holland, London —  (2007)

Fireplaces
Cooking appliances
Barbecue
Earth oven
Arab cuisine
Armenian cuisine
Azerbaijani cuisine
Bengali cuisine
Cuisine of Georgia (country)
Indian cuisine
Israeli cuisine
Iraqi cuisine
Kazakhstani cuisine
Kyrgyz cuisine
Pakistani cuisine
Palestinian cuisine
Punjabi cuisine
Syrian cuisine
Tajik cuisine
Turkish cuisine
Turkmenistan cuisine
Uzbekistani cuisine
Firing techniques